Jan Gundersrud (born 25 November 1966) is a Norwegian former shooter who competed with the rifle.

He represented Norway at the 1988 Summer Olympics, where his best result was 9th place.

External links

References 

Shooters at the 1988 Summer Olympics
Norwegian male sport shooters
1966 births
Living people
Olympic shooters of Norway
20th-century Norwegian people